Associazione Sportiva Dilettantistica Castiadas calcio is an Italian association football club located in Castiadas, Sardinia. It plays in Eccellenza Regionale.

External links
Socio Culturale Castiadas @ Diario sportivo

Football clubs in Italy
Football clubs in Sardinia
Association football clubs established in 1983
1983 establishments in Italy